John Frith may refer to:

John Frith (assailant) (fl. 1760–1791), English petitioner and asylum inmate
John Frith (cartoonist), Australian cartoonist, at The Herald in Melbourne in the 1950s and 1960s 
John Frith (martyr) (1503–1533), English Protestant martyr
John Frith (rugby league) (born 1985), Australian rugby league player
John Frith (trade unionist) (1837–1904), British trade union leader